Nashboro Records was an American gospel label principally active in the 1950s and 1960s.

History
Nashboro was founded in Nashville, Tennessee by Ernie Lafayette Young (1892-1977), who was the owner of a record store, Ernie's Record Mart, and sponsor of a weekly hit parade show on radio station WLAC. In 1951, Young founded Nashboro to issue gospel records, and the following year also created Excello Records to release secular music, especially R&B and blues acts.

Nashboro became a prolific issuer of Southern gospel groups, and Young frequently signed gospel acts from competing labels after they had folded. Some of the groups were backed by the Muscle Shoals Rhythm Section in the studio.

Young died in 1977, by which time Nashboro was increasingly reissuing out of its back catalogue rather than issuing new material. The label's catalogue was sold to AVI Entertainment in 1979, MCA Records in 2000, and Hip-O shortly thereafter. Relatively little of it has seen reissue, though in 2014 Tompkins Square Records released a four-CD compilation of Nashboro artists.

Nashboro was one of several labels to have its catalog of master recordings destroyed in the 2008 Universal fire.

Artists

The Angelic Gospel Singers
The Barrett Sisters
The Famous Boyer Brothers
Alex Bradford
J. Robert Bradley
Brother Joe May
Dorothy Love Coates
The Consolers
Edna Gallmon Cooke
The Crescendos ("Oh Julie")
The Dixie Nightingales
Isaac Douglas
The Fairfield Four
Five Singing Stars
The Gospel Harmonettes
Bessie Griffin

Pilgrim Jubilees
The Radio Four
Cleophus Robinson
Silvertone Singers of Cincinnati
Roscoe Shelton
The Skylarks
The Jewell Gospel Singers
Gloria Spencer
Candi Staton
Slim & the Supreme Angels
The Swanee Quintet
Sister Emma Tucker
Willie Neal Johnson & The Gospel Keynotes
Marvin Yancy
Sister Lucille Pope & the Pearly Gates
The Bright Stars
Oscar Bishop

References

See also
Excello Records

American record labels
Gospel music record labels
Record labels established in 1951
History of Nashville, Tennessee
1951 establishments in Tennessee